Michael Christian "Mikee" Martinez (born November 4, 1996) is a Filipino Olympic figure skater. He is the 2015 Asian Figure Skating Trophy champion, a two-time Triglav Trophy champion and has won one ISU Challenger Series medal, silver at the 2014 Warsaw Cup. Martinez is the first skater from Southeast Asia and from a tropical country to qualify for the Olympics, was the only athlete to represent the Philippines at the 2014 Winter Olympics, and was one of only two to represent the Philippines at the 2018 Winter Olympics.

Early life 
Martinez was born on November 4, 1996, in Parañaque, the youngest of three children. He began experiencing asthmatic bronchitis at two months old and was frequently in the hospital. Although a cold rink initially had a detrimental effect, he stated in 2014 that, "year after year my health keeps improving, so my mother fully supported me to continue skating. She said it's better to spend the money on skating than in the hospital." Martinez graduated from high school in 2013.

Career

Early years 
Martinez began skating in 2005 at the SM Southmall ice rink. In 2009, he missed two months after a skating blade cut his thigh. In addition to training in Manila, in 2010 he began spending several months a year in California, United States working with John Nicks and Ilia Kulik.

Martinez debuted on the ISU Junior Grand Prix (JGP) series in the 2010–11 season. In 2011, he tore two ligaments in his ankle, leading to three months of recovery. In April 2012, he tore a medial ligament in his knee and was off the ice for three months.

2012–13 season: First senior international title 
Martinez landed his first triple Axel jump in competition at a 2012 JGP event in Lake Placid, New York. He placed 6th at a JGP competition in Zagreb, Croatia.

At the 2012 Crystal Skate of Romania, Martinez won his first senior international title, also a first for the Philippines. He finished fifth in his second appearance at the 2013 World Junior Figure Skating Championships and set a new personal-best overall score of 191.64 points. A fractured ankle kept him off the ice for two months in 2013.

2013–14 season: Sochi Olympics 

Martinez started his season at the 2013 JGP Latvia where he finished 4th. He then competed on the senior level at the 2013 Nebelhorn Trophy, the last qualifying event for the 2014 Winter Olympics. He finished 7th and earned a spot for the Philippines in men's singles — a first for his country. Martinez then competed at the 2013 JGP Estonia and won his first JGP medal, a bronze. In January 2014, he received treatment for an inflamed knee. He withdrew from the 2014 Four Continents Championships but competed at Skate Helena and took the gold medal.

The first skater in the Winter Olympics to come from Southeast Asia, Martinez was also the only athlete representing the Philippines at the 2014 Winter Olympics in Sochi and served as his country's flagbearer at the opening ceremony. Viktor Kudriavtsev coached him for one month leading up to the Olympics. At the Olympics, Martinez qualified for the free skate after placing 19th in the short program with a score of 64.81 points, a season best. He scored 119.44 in the free skate and finished 19th overall with a total score of 184.25.

MVP Sports Foundation supported the skater and announced a bonus of $10,000 after the Olympics. He was named an adopted son of Pasay by Mayor Antonino Calixto.

Recovering from a recurring knee injury after the Olympics, Martinez was replaced by Christopher Caluza at the 2014 World Championships. He returned to competition in April at the Triglav Trophy, where he won the gold medal. In June 2014, he began training at Hackensack, New Jersey's Ice House, under the guidance of Nikolai Morozov.

2014–15 season: Challenger Series medal 
Making his ISU Challenger Series (CS) debut, Martinez finished sixth overall at the Lombardia Trophy. He was assigned to his first senior Grand Prix event, the 2014 Skate America. In his short program, he fell on his triple Axel, but landed all his other jumps and received level fours on his camel spin, his flying sit spin, and his step sequence; he finished ninth. He also placed ninth in the free skate, falling on his triple Axel, under-rotating his triple toe in the triple Lutz-triple toe combination, and stepping out in his double Axel towards the end of the program. Martinez finished tenth overall.

In November 2014, Martinez competed at the CS Warsaw Cup where he won the silver medal behind Russia's Alexander Petrov. Martinez posted new personal-best scores with a total of 213.38 points. Martinez competed in his first Worlds at the 2015 World Championships, finishing in 21st position.

2015–16 season: Asian Trophy title 
Martinez withdrew from several summer competitions due to ongoing therapy and rehabilitation for his spine. He also was unable to compete at the 2015 CS U.S. International Classic due to acute asthma.

He started his season by winning gold at the 2015 Asian Figure Skating Trophy, becoming the first Filipino to win the event. He then competed at 2015 Cup of China where he finished 6th with a new personal-best overall score of 220.36 points. He placed 4th at the 2015 CS Warsaw Cup and 7th at the 2015 CS Golden Spin of Zagreb.

Martinez went on to achieve his best placements at senior ISU Championships. In February, he finished 9th out of 23 competitors at the 2016 Four Continents Championships in Taipei. Competing a month later at the 2016 World Championships in Boston, he finished 19th out of 30 competitors. Due to inconsistency in training, he dropped his original plan of including a quad jump, deciding to include the jump the following season.

2016–17 season 
At the 2017 Four Continents Championships, Martinez placed 14th in the short program, free skate and overall. At the 2017 Asian Winter Games, a multi-sport event held every four years, he placed 7th in the short program, 9th in the free skate, and 9th overall. At the 2017 World Championships, Martinez placed 24th in the short program and free skate, as well as overall.

2017–18 season : Pyeongchang Olympics 

At the 2017 Southeast Asian Games, Martinez won silver behind Malaysia's Julian Yee. In September, he placed 8th at the 2017 CS Nebelhorn Trophy, the final qualifying opportunity for the 2018 Winter Olympics. Due to his result, his country did not qualify in figure skating but finished as the first alternate.

In January 2018, after Sweden relinquished its Olympic spot, it was transferred to the Philippines, allowing Martinez to compete in South Korea. The short program of the figure skating men's singles at the 2018 Winter Olympics was contested on February 16, 2018. Martinez was the sixth to perform, skating to the tune of  “Emerald Tiger” by Vanessa-Mae, garnering a total of 55.56 points finishing 28th out of 30 competitors. He failed to advance to the free skate after not placing among the top 24. Had he advanced, he planned skate to the songs “El Tango de Roxanne” from Moulin Rouge! and “Tango de los Exilados” in the free skate program, which were the same songs he used in the 2017 Southeast Asian Games.

Despite failing to advance, Tom Carrasco, the chef de mission of Philippine delegation to the Games remarked that Martinez did his best given the skater's "condition and circumstances" and the official relayed that Zagor described Martinez's short program as "not a bad performance".

2018–21 : Hiatus 
After the Pyeongchang stint, Martinez said he will not retire and will just rest for a short while. He has stated that he will prepare for the 2019 Southeast Asian Games. Though in September 2018, Martinez's break from the sport has been described as an indefinite leave with no time table on when he will resume skating. He also went on to become a coach and a social media influencer in the United States; he has been occasionally frequenting the country since 2010.

Martinez did not participate in the 2019 Southeast Asian Games, with the Philippine Skating Union saying that he declined take part in the national qualifiers. However it was later reported that his non-participation was due to a miscommunication between Martinez and the sports federation.

Though in 2019, he didn't engage in competitive skating, Martinez maintained his fitness by doing workouts and routines. By December 2019, Martinez is already part of a new management team, DigiStar PH. It is reported that he will resume training in 2020.

2022– : Return 
Martinez remarked that he has made mistakes in his life and vowed to return to competitive skating intending to qualify for the 2022 Winter Olympics. He began training with New Jersey-based Russian coach Nikolai Morozov. However amidst to the COVID-19 pandemic, Martinez has returned to the Philippines in June 2020 where his training was limited to outside the skating rink due to pandemic-related measures. His immediate goal is to qualify for the 2021 World Figure Skating Championships but was not able to do so.

On April 7, 2021, Martinez declared himself to be "officially back on ice" and plans to join the CS Nebelhorn Trophy in September 2021 as part of a bid to qualify for the 2022 Winter Olympics. He started a fundraising for his campaign with his management team, Virtual Playground and the Philippine Skating Federation helping him secure sponsors.

The Philippine Skating Union is limited to one entry for each gender for the Nebelhorn Trophy, with Martinez having to contend against Christopher Caluza and Edrian Celestino for the berth in the federation's Olympic Qualifier Evaluation. However due to an injury, Martinez decided foregoing his bid to qualify for the Nebelhorn Trophy, consequentially for the Winter Olympics.

Programs

Competitive highlights 
GP: Grand Prix; CS: Challenger Series; JGP: Junior Grand Prix

Detailed results

References

External links
 

 
 
 

Filipino male single skaters
1996 births
Living people
People from Parañaque
Figure skaters at the 2014 Winter Olympics
Olympic figure skaters of the Philippines
Figure skaters at the 2017 Asian Winter Games
Asian Games competitors for the Philippines
People from Muntinlupa
Sportspeople from Metro Manila
Figure skaters at the 2018 Winter Olympics
Southeast Asian Games silver medalists for the Philippines
Southeast Asian Games medalists in figure skating
Competitors at the 2017 Southeast Asian Games
Figure skaters at the 2012 Winter Youth Olympics